Agonum cyclifer is a species of ground beetles in the family Carabidae. It is found in Central America and North America.

References

Further reading

 Arnett, R.H. Jr., and M. C. Thomas. (eds.). (2000). American Beetles, Volume I: Archostemata, Myxophaga, Adephaga, Polyphaga: Staphyliniformia. CRC Press LLC, Boca Raton, FL.
 Arnett, Ross H. (2000). American Insects: A Handbook of the Insects of America North of Mexico. CRC Press.
 Richard E. White. (1983). Peterson Field Guides: Beetles. Houghton Mifflin Company.

cyclifer
Beetles described in 1884